Edward Benson (20 November 1907 – 11 September 1967) was a Welsh cricketer. He played for Oxford University in 1928 and 1929, and Gloucestershire between 1929 and 1931.

Benson attended Blundell's School in Devon before going up to Merton College, Oxford in 1926. In the 1928 University Match, batting at number 11, he and Charles Hill-Wood defended for 100 minutes to deny Cambridge victory on the last day. He played for the Gentlemen at Lord's in 1929. He toured New Zealand in 1929–30 with the England Test team as the reserve wicket-keeper, but did not play any of the Test matches.

He also played Rugby union for Oxford and served in World War II as a colonel in the Royal Artillery. After the war he joined the Prudential Assurance Co. in South Africa and from about 1957 was their branch manager in Cape Town.

References

External links

1907 births
1967 deaths
Welsh cricketers
People educated at Blundell's School
Gloucestershire cricketers
Oxford University cricketers
Oxford University RFC players
Gentlemen cricketers
Marylebone Cricket Club cricketers
Cricketers from Cardiff
Gentlemen of England cricketers
Alumni of Merton College, Oxford
Royal Artillery officers
British Army personnel of World War II
English cricketers of 1919 to 1945
H. D. G. Leveson Gower's XI cricketers
Wicket-keepers